These are the results of the women's team all-around competition, one of six events for female competitors in artistic gymnastics at the 1984 Summer Olympics in Los Angeles.  The compulsory and optional rounds took place on July 30 and August 1 at UCLA’s Pauley Pavilion.

Due to 1984 Summer Olympics boycott, USSR women's national gymnastics team did not participate in the 1984 Olympics. The 1984 Olympics marked the first time that the USSR did not win the gold medal in Olympic women's team all-around competition, since the 1948 Summer Olympics.  Romania won gold in this event for the first time in history.

Results
The final score for each team was determined by combining all of the scores earned by the team on each apparatus during the compulsory and optional rounds.  If all six gymnasts on a team performed a routine on a single apparatus during compulsories or optionals, only the five highest scores on that apparatus counted toward the team total.

External links
Official Olympic Report
www.gymnasticsresults.com
www.gymn-forum.net

Women's team all-around
1984 in women's gymnastics
Women's events at the 1984 Summer Olympics